Per Berg (born 6 August 1961) is a Danish curler.

Teams

Men's

Mixed

References

External links
 

Living people
1961 births
Danish male curlers
Danish curling champions